George Mark Collie (born January 18, 1956) is an American country music singer, songwriter, musician, actor, record producer, and fundraiser for Type 1 diabetes study. He has won awards and acclaim for his music, his acting, and his philanthropy. His singing career has included five major-label albums: four for MCA Nashville and one for Giant Records. Sixteen of his singles have charted on Hot Country Songs, including the top ten hits "Even the Man in the Moon Is Cryin'" and "Born to Love You".

Collie has also written songs for Aaron Tippin, Alabama, Garth Brooks, Tim McGraw, and JT Hodges. His acting career includes roles in Fire Down Below, The Punisher, and Kill Switch.

Singing career
From the beginnings of his performing and recording career, Collie's singing and performing style drew comparisons to Bruce Springsteen and Johnny Cash as a result of Collie’s combination of Rockabilly energy, intensity, and clever songwriting.

Hardin County Line and Born and Raised in Black & White
Collie began his career on MCA Records in 1989 after being discovered by label representatives. Tony Brown, then-president of the label, helped Collie secure his contract. His debut album Hardin County Line was released in 1990, with Brown and Doug Johnson co-producing. The album produced four singles: "Something with a Ring to It", "Looks Aren't Everything", the title track, and "Let Her Go", which was the highest-charting of the four, at #18 on Hot Country Songs. Its B-side, "Where There's Smoke", was later a Top 40 single for Archer/Park in 1994.

His second album, Born and Raised in Black & White, produced Top 40 singles in "Calloused Hands" and "She's Never Comin' Back", while "It Don't Take a Lot" peaked at #70. Steve Huey of Allmusic described the album as "more polished" than its predecessor.

Mark Collie and Unleashed
Collie's third album for MCA, Mark Collie, was produced by Don Cook. It accounted for his two highest-charting singles: "Even the Man in the Moon Is Cryin'" at #5, and "Born to Love You" at #6. After those two songs, "Shame Shame Shame Shame" and "Something's Gonna Change Her Mind" both made top 30 as well. Brian Mansfield wrote that the album was "At once a move to the mainstream and a return to Collie's West Tennessee rockabilly roots."

Unleashed, was released in 1994. Its first single, "It Is No Secret", failed to make Top 40, while the only other release, "Hard Lovin' Woman", made #13. The album included guest vocals from Deborah Allen, Carlene Carter, and James House.

Mid 1990s-present
Collie signed to Giant Records in 1995. His only album for the label was Tennessee Plates, which Collie co-produced with James Stroud. Its two charting singles were "Three Words, Two Hearts, One Night", his last Top 40 entry on the country chart, and "Steady as She Goes". After these two songs, he charted at #72 with "Love to Burn", which he recorded for the Columbia Records multi-artist compilation NASCAR: Hotter than Asphalt. Collie covered Jim Croce's "Rapid Roy (The Stock Car Boy)" on the 1997 tribute album Jim Croce: A Nashville Tribute. In 1998, MCA released a budget-line compilation titled Even the Man in the Moon Is Cryin, which comprised several of his MCA singles.

He did not release another album until Rose Covered Garden in 2006. A live album, Alive at Brushy Mountain, was released in 2012.

He has performed onstage with many artists including Tim McGraw, Kenny Chesney, and Johnny Cash. He continues to tour actively both in the U.S. and Europe.

In September 2013 Collie signed to 101 Ranch records and was the first artist signed to them. "I'm thrilled to have a new home with 101 Ranch Records and to be working with a terrific team with Doug, Bob and Tammy," says Mark Collie. "There are some new and exciting projects coming up on the horizon that I look forward to debuting with the label."

Songwriting and producing
Collie's songwriting credits include Garth Brooks, Tim McGraw, Alabama, and George Jones. He is also noted with writing songs for Hollywood Movies such as Lions Gate's The Punisher starring John Travolta and  Fire Down Below starring Steven Seagal.

In addition to his own recordings, Collie has produced or co-produced albums for Brandt Vogel, JT Hodges, Kyle Sherman, and the Horn Family.

Acting
Collie has acted in television series and movies, independent features and Hollywood feature films. Starting in 1994 and continuing to present Collie has played a variety of characters including in 1999, Johnny Cash in the short I Still Miss Someone which he also co-wrote and co-produced with filmmaker John Lloyd Miller. Collie has appeared as Frankie Gray on the ABC series Nashville. Collie had a small role as assassin Harry Heck, where he played a song called "In Time" in front of Castle, in 2004's The Punisher.

Philanthropy
Collie was diagnosed with Type 1 diabetes as a teenager and in the early 1990s after finding success as a country music singer Collie began a series of celebrity/NASCAR events that included Legend Car races and concerts that have raised millions of dollars for research into a cure for Type 1 juvenile diabetes. Collie's efforts have resulted in a research Chair at Vanderbilt University, The Mark Collie Chair in Diabetes Research, and his Mark Collie Foundation continues to generate donations.

In February 1991 Collie was part of a filmed benefit concert in Nashville's Centennial Park along with George Jones to salute American troops in Operation Desert Storm. The concert was filmed by director John Lloyd Miller and distributed for free to Armed Forces Television and to United States troops throughout the Middle East.

On April 3, 1996, Aaron Tippin and Mark Collie helped organize and load a cargo plane with 25,000 country cassettes for free distribution to United States troops in Bosnia and was later awarded The American Spirit Award by the United States Air Force for his efforts.

Collie has performed at benefits throughout his career for a diverse collection of causes including The Nashville Food Bank, The Blue Note Fund, Fallen Police, and Victims of Domestic Violence among others.

Personal life
In February 2001 Mark Collie delivered the eulogy for race car legend Dale Earnhardt at a memorial service that included performances by Vince Gill and Steve Wariner at the Gaylord Entertainment Center in Nashville, Tennessee.

Collie married longtime girlfriend Tammy Stewart at a private ceremony in Columbia, Tennessee, on October 24, 2009. The two split their time between their home in Fort Worth, Texas, and Nashville, Tennessee.

Discography

Studio albums

Compilation albums

Singles

Miscellaneous appearances

Filmography

Film

Television

Music videos

Awards

(all columns are sortable)

References

External links
Official website

1956 births
American country singer-songwriters
American male singer-songwriters
Living people
Singer-songwriters from Tennessee
MCA Records artists
People from Waynesboro, Tennessee
Giant Records (Warner) artists
American male television actors
American male film actors
People with type 1 diabetes
Country musicians from Tennessee